Spectral hole burning is the frequency-selective bleaching of the absorption spectrum of a material, which leads to an increased transmission (a  "spectral hole") at  the selected frequency.

Two basic requirements must be met for the phenomenon to be observed:

 The  spectrum  is inhomogeneously broadened 
 The material undergoes, subsequent to light absorption, a modification which changes its absorption spectrum. Typical materials include dye molecules dissolved in suitable host matrices; the frequency-selective irradiation is usually realized by a narrow-band laser.

Particular case 

Most molecules and atoms always return from the excited state to the initial ground state. In some situations, however, this may not happen. For example, some organic dye molecules can undergo a photochemical reaction, which alters the whole chemical structure of the molecule. If such a photochemically active molecule absorbs light, then with a probability of a few percent it will not return to the initial, educt state, but will rather switch over to a new product ground state. Often the homogeneous absorption spectrum of the new product is much different from that of the educt, and the corresponding inhomogeneous bands do not overlap.

Spectral hole width can be expressed as follows:

References

Sources
 http://www.iupac.org/publications/pac/pdf/1995/pdf/6701x0191.pdf
 http://www.physics.montana.edu/arebane/research/tutorials/hole_burning/index.html

Spectroscopy